Ukrainians in Moldova represent Moldova's largest ethnic minority. According to the 2014 Moldovan census, 181,035 ethnic Ukrainians lived in Moldova, representing 6.6% of the population of the country.

Furthermore, as a result of the 2022 Russian invasion of Ukraine, an influx of Ukrainian refugees entered the country escaping the war. More precisely, as of 26 July of that year, 549,333 refugees had entered Moldova from Ukraine.

See also
 Moldovans and Romanians in Ukraine
 Moldova–Ukraine relations

References

 
Ethnic groups in Moldova
 
Moldova